Desert Research Institute (DRI) is the nonprofit research campus of the Nevada System of Higher Education (NSHE), the organization that oversees all publicly supported higher education in the U.S. state of Nevada. At DRI, approximately 460 research faculty and support staff engage in $43 million in sponsored research each year. DRI's environmental research programs are divided into three core divisions (Atmospheric Sciences, Earth and Ecosystem Sciences, and Hydrologic Sciences) and a robust K-12 STEM education program. Established in 1988, the institute's Nevada Medal awards "outstanding achievement in science and engineering".

Programs

Atmospheric sciences
The DRI Atmospheric Modeling group implements a full suite of numerical models of the atmosphere and climate including fine-scale computational fluid dynamics codes, Lagrangian particle models, chemical transport models, medium-resolution regional weather and climate models, and fully coupled ocean-atmospheric global climate system models. They conduct basic and applied research related to fundamental weather and climate processes, weather predictability and operational forecasting for lead-times from hours to seasonal, regional hydroclimate, air-quality modeling and forecasting, dust modeling, and renewable energy applications. DRI's Atmospheric Modeling faculty and staff have expertise with the following modeling tools:

 CFD Models: High-resolution simulations of turbulent flows for fine-scale analyses. The openFOAM framework allows for traditional aerodynamics applications and the coupling of additional physics, such as multiphase flows, porous objects, and particle transport.
 CALMET and CALPUFF: Diagnostic meteorology and dispersion models for short- and long-range transport assessments.
 WRF Model: Diagnostic and forecast model to develop meteorological solutions from sub-kilometer to regional scales, from case studies to intra-seasonal to decadal regional climate trends and variability. WRF is used as a basic research tool and for atmospheric applications, including operational forecasting.
 Global Climate System Models: Implementation and development of the Climate Earth System model (CESM) for process-based understanding, climate engineering, and climate change and variability impact assessments.
 CMAQ and CAMx: Three-dimensional urban- and regional-scale multi-pollutant photochemical grid models.
 Stochastic Trajectory model: A highly adaptable  dispersion Lagrangian model for backward and forward trajectories of particles for adaptation and mitigation and feasibility studies.
 HYSPLIT Trajectory Model: Lagrangian model available from NOAA Air Resources Laboratory used to compute air parcel trajectories and dispersion of atmospheric pollutants.
 SMOKE Emissions Model: The SMOKE Modeling System from EPA is used to process emissions from different anthropogenic sources. Also, BEIS and MEGAN software can be used to process emissions from biogenic sources.

Western Regional Climate Center

The Western Regional Climate Center (WRCC) in Reno, Nevada, delivers high-quality climate data services at national, regional, and state levels working with NOAA partners in the National Climatic Data Center, National Weather Service, the American Association of State Climatologists, and NOAA Research Institutes. This successful effort resulted in jointly developed products, services, and capabilities that enhance the delivery of climate information to the American public and builds a solid foundation for a National Climate Service. Inaugurated in 1986, WRCC is one of six regional climate centers in the United States.

Cloud seeding program
DRI weather modification research produced the Nevada State Cloud Seeding Program in the 1960s. This initiative seeks to augment snowfall in mountainous regions of Nevada to increase snowpack and water supply. DRI researchers use ground stations and aircraft to release microscopic silver iodide particles into winter clouds, stimulating the formation of ice crystals that develop to snow.

Research indicates that cloud seeding leads to precipitation rate increases of 0.1–1.5 millimeters per hour.

Hydrological sciences
The Division of Hydrologic Sciences (DHS) is one of three scientific research divisions within DRI. Since its inception in 1960, DHS faculty have built a solid reputation for delivering high-quality research, development, and education services in the interdisciplinary fields of hydrologic sciences and engineering.
 
The mission of DHS is to contribute to society's fundamental knowledge and understanding of hydrologic systems and to serve as a leader in the long-term sustainability of water resources. In addition to serving as experts in water resources, DHS faculty are renowned for their ability to contribute and deliver cutting-edge solutions in fields associated with earth sciences.

Earth and ecosystem sciences
The Division of Earth and Ecosystem Sciences (DEES) is one of three scientific research divisions within DRI. Since its inception in 1999, DEES has grown steadily and built a strong program of research, development, and education in the earth and ecosystem sciences. The DEES research portfolio reflects the interplay between local, state, national, and international environmental issues, the expertise of our faculty, and the availability of research funding.
 
The mission of DEES is to conduct high-quality basic and applied research in the life and earth sciences, particularly those dealing with complex issues related to soil physics and landscape geomorphology, environmental health, life in extreme environments and biodiversity, STEM education, archeology and architectural history, and environmental spatial analysis and remote sensing.

History
A two-page bill signed into law by the Nevada Governor Grant Sawyer on March 23, 1959, authorized establishment of the Desert Research Institute at the University of Nevada, Reno.

UNR hired Dr. Wendell Mordy as the Founding Director (1960–1969) of the university's Desert Research Institute, which initially was  an office at the top of the historic Morrill Hall building on UNR's campus. Early on Mordy also initiated the development of the UNR's Fleishmann Atmospherium Planetarium.

Campuses
Main research campuses

 Dandini Campus – Reno, Nevada .
 Southern Nevada Science Center – Paradise, Nevada .

Subsidiary campuses
 Boulder City Research Facility – Boulder City, Nevada.
 Stead Research Facility - Reno, Nevada

See also
 Atmospheric dispersion modeling
 List of atmospheric dispersion models

Notes

References

External links

 
 The Atmospheric and Dispersion Modeling Program

1959 establishments in Nevada
1988 establishments in Nevada
Atmospheric dispersion modeling
Buildings and structures in Paradise, Nevada
Education in Reno, Nevada
Educational institutions established in 1959
Educational institutions established in 1988
Meteorological research institutes
Nevada System of Higher Education
Nuclear research institutes
Universities and colleges in Clark County, Nevada
Public universities and colleges in Nevada
Environmental research institutes